Leona Valerie Theron (born 7 November 1966 in Durban) is a judge on the Constitutional Court of South Africa and formerly of the Supreme Court of Appeal. She was first appointed to the bench in 1999, aged 33, becoming the first black woman judge on the KwaZulu-Natal High Court. She was appointed to the Constitutional Court on 1 July 2017 by President Jacob Zuma to replace recently retired Johann van der Westhuizen. Theron is married to Charles Sarjoo and has four children.

Education 
She received her Bachelor's Degree from University of Natal in 1987. Theron went on to receive her LLB (Bachelors of Law) from there in 1989. In 1989, she received a Fulbright Scholarship that allowed her to go on to get her LLM (Masters of Law) at Georgetown University in Washington, DC.

Professional history 
Early in her career, Theron was an advocate in her hometown of Durban. From 1983 to June 1989, while receiving her bachelor's and LLB, she worked as a candidate attorney at Dawson & Partners in Durban. From February to June 1989, she was also an Adjunct Lecturer at Mangosuthu Technikon, Umlazi. Following her move to Washington, DC to study at Georgetown, she worked at the International Labor Organization as Special Assistant to the Director, until June 1990 when she became a Summer Associate at the Occupational Safety and Health Law Centre.

From 1990 to 1995, before being appointed to the Judge White Commission, she served as an Advocate of the High Court for Kwa-Zulu Natal, a Summer Associate act Reich, Adell & Crost Law Offices, a Trainer at the Community Law Centre, a part time Lecturer at the University of Natal, and then as a Provincial Adjudication Secretary at the Independent Electoral Commission.

She was appointed to the Judge White Commission by President Mandela in 1995. Then, in 1999, she was appointed to the High Court of South Africa, making her the youngest judge in the country at 32 years old and also making her the first black female judge in her province.

References

1966 births
Living people
South African judges
South African women judges
Judges of the Constitutional Court of South Africa